Nome City Field  is a state-owned public-use airport located one nautical mile (1.85 km) north of the central business district of Nome, a city in the Nome Census Area of the U.S. state of Alaska.

Facilities and aircraft 
Nome City Field has one runway designated 3/21 with a gravel surface measuring 1,950 by 110 feet (594 x 34 m). There are 31 aircraft based at this airport: 30 single-engine and 1 ultralight.

References

External links 
 FAA Alaska airport diagram (GIF)

Airports in the Nome Census Area, Alaska
Nome, Alaska